Nigel Philip Casey  (born 29 May 1969) is a British diplomat, who served as the British High Commissioner to South Africa from April 2017 until April 2021 and as the British Ambassador to Bosnia and Herzegovina from September 2011 until 2013.

Early life 
Nigel Philip Casey was born on 29 May 1969 in Leamington Spa, Warwickshire to Michael Casey and of Josephine Casey.

Casey was educated at Rockport School, an independent school in Holywood, County Down, Blundell’s School, an independent school in Tiverton, Devon. Casey attended Balliol College, Oxford, from 1987 to 1990, graduating with a BA (Hons) in modern history.

Career 
Casey joined the Foreign and Commonwealth Office in 1991.

Casey was appointed a Member of the Royal Victorian Order (MVO) in 1995.

Ambassador to Bosnia and Herzegovina 
Casey was appointed the British Ambassador to Bosnia and Herzegovina in September 2011.

Casey left this appointment in 2013.

Casey worked as the Private Secretary to the Prime Minister for Foreign Policy from 2014 to 2016.

High Commissioner to South Africa 
Casey was appointed the British High Commissioner to South Africa in April 2017.

Casey was appointed a Companion of the Order of St Michael and St George in 2017.

In August 2019, Casey said that Brexit would be an opportunity for South Africa, and that he was confident South Africa would be on the list of post-Brexit business partners.

Casey left this appointment in April 2021.

Personal life 
Casey married his wife, Clare Crocker, in 2002. They have two children, a son and a daughter.

See also 
 South Africa–United Kingdom relations

References

External links 

 
 Nigel Casey Profile on GOV.UK
 

Living people
1969 births
British diplomats
Ambassadors and High Commissioners of the United Kingdom to South Africa
Alumni of Balliol College, Oxford
People from Leamington Spa
Companions of the Order of St Michael and St George
Members of the Royal Victorian Order
People educated at Rockport School